Kyle Edmund was the defending champion, but lost in the first round of qualifying to Norbert Gombos.

Andy Murray won the title, defeating Stan Wawrinka in the final, 3–6, 6–4, 6–4. This was Murray's first singles title since winning the 2017 Dubai Tennis Championships. This was also Murray's first appearance in an ATP singles final since returning to the ATP Tour after his career-saving hip resurfacing operation.

Seeds
The top four seeds receive a bye into the second round.

Draw

Finals

Top half

Bottom half

Qualifying

Seeds

Qualifiers

Qualifying draw

First qualifier

Second qualifier

Third qualifier

Fourth qualifier

References

External links
 Main draw
 Qualifying draw

2019 ATP Tour
2019